The state cessions are those areas of the United States that the separate states ceded to the federal government in the late 18th and early 19th centuries.  The cession of these lands, which for the most part lay between the Appalachian Mountains and the Mississippi River, was key to establishing a harmonious union among the former British colonies.

The areas ceded comprise , or 10.4 percent of current United States territory, and make up all or part of 10 states. This does not include the areas later ceded by Texas to the  federal government, which make up parts of five more states.

Background
Most of the British American colonies were established in the 17th and early 18th century when geographical knowledge of North America was incomplete.  Many of these colonies were established by royal proclamation or charter that defined their boundaries as stretching "from sea to sea"; others did not have western boundaries established at all.  These colonies thus ended up with theoretical extents that overlapped each other and conflicted with the claims and settlements established by other European powers. The British government's Royal Proclamation of 1763, while not resolving the disputes over the colonies' trans-Appalachian claims, succeeded in slowing down the movement of people into the region and the making of new claims in it. Many, however, ignored the proclamation, and various frontier settlement enterprises, owing allegiance to disparate colonial governments, continued.

By the time of the American Revolution, the boundaries between the Thirteen Colonies that became the United States had been for the most part surveyed and agreed upon. Their land claims also corresponded in varying degrees to the actual reality on the ground in the west at the eve of the Revolution.  Kentucky, for instance, was organized into a county of Virginia in 1776, with Virginia serving as practical sovereign over the area until its admission into the Union as a separate state in 1792.  Massachusetts' claims to land in modern-day Michigan and Wisconsin, by contrast, amounted to little more than lines drawn on a map.

The Treaty of Paris (1763) that ended the war known as the French and Indian War in North America had France cede most of its claims to land on the continent to Great Britain and Spain.  Great Britain, gaining the eastern half of France's southern lands, extended the claims of its colonies of Massachusetts, Connecticut, Virginia, North Carolina, South Carolina, and Georgia to the Mississippi River; in some cases, this reinforced earlier charter claims.

The resolution of the claims

The Treaty of Paris (1783) that ended the American Revolution established American sovereignty over the land between the Appalachians and the Mississippi; the jobs of determining how that land should be governed, and how the conflicting claims to it by several of the states should be resolved, were one of the first major tasks facing the new nation.

The potential for trouble arising from these claims was twofold.  One problem was obvious: in many cases more than one state laid claim to the same piece of territory, but clearly only one would be ultimately recognized as the sovereign.  The other conflict also threatened the peace of the new union.  Only seven of the thirteen states had western land claims, and the other, "landless" states were fearful of being overwhelmed by states that controlled vast stretches of the new frontier.  Virginia in particular, which already encompassed 1 in 5 inhabitants of the new nation, laid claim to modern-day Kentucky, and the vast territory it called Illinois County, and the smaller states feared that it would come to completely dominate the union.

In the end, most of the trans-Appalachian land claims were ceded to the Federal government between 1781 and 1787; New York, New Hampshire, and the hitherto unrecognized Vermont government resolved their squabbles by 1791, and Kentucky was separated from Virginia and made into a new state in 1792. The cessions were not entirely selfless—in some cases the cessions were made in exchange for federal assumption of the states' Revolutionary War debts—but the states' reasonably graceful cessions of their oft-conflicting claims prevented early, perhaps catastrophic, rifts among the states of the young Republic, and assuaged the fears of the "landless" states enough to convince them to ratify the new United States Constitution.  The cessions also set the stage for the settlement of the Upper Midwest and the expansion of the U.S. into the center of the North American continent, and also established the pattern by which land newly acquired by the United States would be organized into new states rather than attached to old ones.

Georgia held on to its claims over trans-Appalachian land for another decade, and this claim was complicated by the fact that much of the land was also disputed between the United States and Spain.  When Georgia finally sold the land west of its current boundaries to the United States for cash in 1802, the last phase of western cessions was complete.

Details of the cessions

States with land claims

States without land claims

Texas

Later in the 19th century, there was one more case of a state ceding some of its land to the federal government. Before the Republic of Texas joined the United States in 1845, it claimed a good deal of land that had never been under the de facto control of the Texan government – Texan attempts to exercise control of these territories as a sovereign state (most famously, the Santa Fe expedition) had ended in disaster.  Thus, there was a border dispute between Texas, Mexico, and Native American tribes that the U.S. government inherited upon the annexation of Texas. This was one of the causes of the Mexican–American War of 1846–47 (another being the western land aspirations of the U.S. coupled with the refusal by the United Mexican States to sell its territory to the U.S.). After the American victory in that war, the Mexican government recognized American sovereignty over the disputed Texan lands and also ceded/sold the land extending west to the Pacific Ocean. The Mexican government was paid $25,000,000 under the Treaty of Guadalupe Hidalgo of 1848.

In addition, the maximalist land claims of the Republic of Texas did not set the northern and western  borders of the State of Texas. Most, but not all, of its northern boundary had been set by a treaty between the United States and the Spanish Empire – along the Red River.

In an act of Congress, the Compromise of 1850, Texas ceded its conflicting northern and western territorial claims to the U.S. in return for debt relief, removing its conflicting claims from the U.S. territorial gains of the Mexican–American War. This ceded land eventually became portions of the states of Kansas (1861), Colorado (1876), Wyoming (1890), Oklahoma (1907), and New Mexico (1912).

See also
 Ohio Country
 Illinois Country
 Historic regions of the United States
 Territorial evolution of the United States
Trans-Appalachia

References

Further reading
 Paul Wallace Gates, History of Public Land Law Development, Chapter III State Cessions of Western Land Claims. Public Land Law Review Commission, (1968), Washington D.C.

External links
 Map of state claims (1)
 Map of state claims (2)
 Map of state claims (3)
 Map of state claims (4)
 Map of state claims (5)

History of United States expansionism
History of the Midwestern United States
Pre-statehood history of Texas
Territorial evolution of the United States